Wicie may refer to the following places:
Wicie, Łódź Voivodeship (central Poland)
Wicie, Masovian Voivodeship (east-central Poland)
Wicie, West Pomeranian Voivodeship (north-west Poland)